Lagadec or Lagadeg is a surname, and may refer to;

Lagadec derives from the Breton adjectif lagadeg which means "who has good eyes, possibly big eyes".

 (born 1948), French economics researcher
 - Breton writer
Jean-Louis Lagadec (1933–2012), French footballer
 or Lagadeuc - Breton priest
 (born 1950), French journalist and Breton activist
 (1962-1989), French nurse and daughter of Jean-Baptiste Lagadec

Breton-language surnames